The Sprague family is an American business and political family in Rhode Island and Massachusetts. The family ran the largest textile firm in the United States and two of its members (William Sprague III and William Sprague IV) held the offices of Governor of Rhode Island and United States Senator.

The family arrived in the United States in 1629 when Ralph, Richard, and William Sprague emigrated from Upwey, Dorset, England to Naumkeag. The family arrived in Rhode Island in 1709 after William's son, also named William, purchased a house in Providence. In the early 1800s, William Sprague II founded a successful textile business in Cranston, Rhode Island. During the early 1870s, the output of the Sprague family's nine mills was greater than all of the other mills in the United States combined and their profits were around $20 million annually. Due to bad investments and careless speculation, the company fell into receivership following the Panic of 1873. By 1875, almost all of the Spragues' assets had been sold.

Francis Sprague, who was unrelated to Ralph, Richard, and William, settled in the Plymouth Colony in 1623. The two separate Sprague family trees converged with the marriage of Peleg Sprague, great-grandson of William Sprague, and Mercy Chandler, great-great granddaughter of Francis Sprague.

Notable members
William Sprague (1609–1675), first family member to settle in America
Jonathan Sprague (1648–1741), member of the Rhode Island General Assembly from 1695 to 1696, 1699–1700, 1702–1710, 1712, 1714
William Sprague II (1773–1836), founder of the Sprague's milling business
Amasa Sprague (1798–1843), senior partner of A & W Sprague and murder victim
Charles Sprague (1791–1875), poet
Peleg Sprague (1793–1880), Judge of the United States District Court for the District of Massachusetts, U.S. Senator from Maine, and Member of the U.S. House of Representatives from Maine's 4th district
William Sprague III (1799–1856), partner of A & W Sprague, Governor of Rhode Island, and U.S. Senator
John W. Sprague (1817–1893), soldier and railroad executive
Isaac Sprague (1811–1895), botanical illustrator
Charles James Sprague (1823–1903), botanist
William P. Sprague (1827–1899), two-term U.S. Representative from Ohio
Amasa Sprague Jr. (1828–1902), partner of A & W Sprague and founder of Narragansett Park
William Sprague IV (1830–1915), partner of A & W Sprague, Governor of Rhode Island, and U.S. Senator
Charles F. Sprague (1857–1902), Member of the U.S. House of Representatives from Massachusetts's 11th district
Frank J. Sprague (1857-1934), Inventor, Entepreuer, Electric Motor Engineer
Ernest L. Sprague (1876–1944), Secretary of State of Rhode Island
Robert C. Sprague (1900-1991), Electrical Engineer, founder of Sprague Electric, son of Frank J.

References

American families of English ancestry
Families from Massachusetts
Families from Rhode Island
Political families of the United States